Cese dei Marsi is a frazione of the Avezzano comune, in the Marsica subregion (Province of L'Aquila, Abruzzo, Italy).

Frazioni of Avezzano